Dynamite: The Story of Class Violence in America is a 1931 book by Louis Adamic.

Bibliography

External links 

 

1931 non-fiction books
English-language books
Viking Press books